Robert J. Bach (born December 31, 1961), commonly known as Robbie Bach, was the President of Entertainment & Devices Division at Microsoft. He led the division that was responsible for the Xbox, Xbox 360, Zune, Games for Windows, Windows Phone and the Microsoft TV platform.  After 22 years at Microsoft, Robbie announced his retirement from Microsoft effective in the fall of 2010. Robbie now speaks to corporate, academic and civic groups across the country and in 2015 completed his first book, Xbox Revisited: A Game Plan for Corporate and Civic Renewal.

Biography
Robbie Bach was born in Peoria, Illinois and is the son of a former Schlitz executive. He graduated from RJ Reynolds High School in Winston-Salem, North Carolina in 1980. Robbie was a Morehead Scholar at the University of North Carolina at Chapel Hill where he graduated with highest honors in economics and was also named an Academic All-American on the Tar Heel's varsity tennis team. Robbie went to work for Morgan Stanley for two years before going onto became an Arjay Miller Scholar at Stanford University Graduate School of Business where he earned his MBA.

He joined Microsoft in 1988 and was with the company until 2010. He is currently serving on the board of several companies and non-profit organizations. He is now focused on bringing his experiences to positively impact communities through his public speaking engagements and recently published book - Xbox Revisited: A Game Plan for Corporate and Civic Renewal. He is married with three children.

Microsoft career
Robbie Bach joined Microsoft in 1988 and over the next 22 years worked in various marketing, general management and business leadership roles.

Microsoft Office
As the top marketing executive in charge of Microsoft Office during the 1990s, Bach battled against WordPerfect and Lotus when they had 80% market share to Microsoft's 20%. Microsoft Office suite is now Microsoft's second most profitable product, garnering billions in revenue.

Microsoft Europe
From 1990 to 1992, Bach served as the business operations manager for Microsoft Europe, reporting to the president of Microsoft Europe in Paris, where he coordinated business planning and strategy, budgeting, and special projects. He also helped unify Microsoft's once-divided European local units.

President, Entertainment & Devices Division
As president of the Entertainment & Devices (E&D) Division at Microsoft Corp., Robbie Bach drove the company's Connected Entertainment vision, offering consumers new and branded entertainment experiences across music, gaming, video and mobile communications. Bach's responsibilities included guiding new software, services and hardware throughout Microsoft's entertainment and mobility platforms, and bringing those solutions to market with retailers and partners. Bach also managed Microsoft's worldwide retail relationships as well as media and entertainment partner relationships.

Microsoft titles
 Product Manager (Microsoft Works)
 Business Operations Manager (Europe)
 Vice President of Marketing (Desktop Applications Division)
 Vice President of the Learning (Entertainment and Productivity Division)
 Vice President of the Home and Retail division
 Senior Vice President of Home and Entertainment Division
 President of the Entertainment and Devices Division

Board memberships
 Boys & Girls Clubs of America: Board Chairman 2008 - 2010; Board of Governors 2005–Present.
 Sonos: Board of Governors 2011–Present.
 United States Olympic Committee: Board of Directors 2011–Present.
 Bipartisan Policy Center: Board of Directors 2016–Present.
 Brooks Sports: Board of Advisers 2011–2015.
 Year Up Puget Sound: Board of Directors 2012–Present.
 Space Needle: Board of Directors 2011–Present.
 Maninis Inc.: Co-Owner 2014–Present.

References

External links
 Robert J. Bach's bio page at Microsoft PressPass
 Microsoft's Robbie Bach 'thought about killing' Surface - June 2, 2008
 The Inside Story of How Microsoft Killed its Courier Tablet - November 1, 2011

Living people
Microsoft employees
People from Peoria, Illinois
University of North Carolina at Chapel Hill alumni
Stanford Graduate School of Business alumni
1961 births
Corporate executives
American business executives